Luffness is a hamlet in East Lothian, Scotland. It lies between the towns of Gullane and Aberlady and is approximately 20 miles east of Edinburgh.

History
Most of the houses in Luffness are traditional farm cottages; among its notable buildings are Luffness Castle (also known as Luffness House) and Luffness Mill. Luffness New golf course is part of the fine selection of courses in the area, and the Myreton Motor Museum is nearby.

Gallery

See also
List of places in East Lothian

External links

Luffness New Golf Club website
Luffness Castle website

Populated places in East Lothian
Hamlets in Scotland